Seiyun Palace was the royal residence of the sultan of Kathiri, located in the town of Seiyun in the Hadhramaut region, Yemen. It is one of the world’s largest mud-brick structures.

History 
It was completed in the 1920s when the central Hadhramaut province was part of the British protectorate of Aden. At present it is a museum. It opened its doors to the public in 1984. It was closed at the start of the Yemeni Civil War when Al-Qaeda entered Hadramawt. 

Because of the ongoing conflict, it is at 'risk of collapse.' That left it vulnerable to the 2020 Yemen flood that killed dozens of people.

It is featured on Yemen's 1,000-riyal banknote, the highest denomination.

Architecture 
The museum showcases items excavated in the province, including tombstones that date back to the Stone Age and the dawn of civilisation in Yemen. There are also Bronze Age statues, and pottery and ancient manuscripts from the pre-Islamic period. However, its most prized possessions are stashed away, for fear that one of Yemen's warring groups could target them. 

It resembles a giant sandcastle with turrets at its corners. It is seven stories tall and overlooks the town.

References

External links 

Palaces in Yemen
Yemeni monarchy
Archaeological sites in Yemen